Tania is a female given name

Tania may also refer to:

Songs
 "Tania," a song by Camper Van Beethoven from their album Our Beloved Revolutionary Sweetheart
 "Tania", a song by John Rowles
"Tania", a song by Julie Ruin from her album Julie Ruin

Other uses
 La Tania, Savoie, France; a ski resort
 Tania (fungus), a genus of dot lichen

See also
 Tania Borealis, a star in the constellation Ursa Major
 Tania Australis, a star in the constellation Ursa Major
 Tanja (disambiguation)
 Tanya (disambiguation)
 Tonya (disambiguation)
 Tonia (disambiguation)